Andrew Ford  (born 1957) is an English-born Australian composer, writer and radio presenter, known for The Music Show on Radio National.

Biography
Andrew Ford was born in 1957 in Liverpool, UK.

Ford was composer-in-residence with the Australian Chamber Orchestra (1992–94), held the Peggy Glanville-Hicks Composer Fellowship from 1998 to 2000 and was awarded a two-year fellowship by the Music Board of the Australia Council for the Arts for 2005 to 2006. He was appointed composer-in-residence at the Australian National Academy of Music in 2009.

Beyond composing, Ford has been an academic in the Faculty of Creative Arts at the University of Wollongong (1983–95). He has written widely on music and published seven books. He wrote, presented and co-produced the radio series Illegal Harmonies, Dots on the Landscape and Music and Fashion. Since 1995 he has presented The Music Show on ABC Radio National.

Ford studied at Lancaster University with Edward Cowie and John Buller.

Selected works

Music theatre 

Poe, opera (1983, premiered 1985, Sydney Opera House)
Whispers for tenor and chamber orchestra (1990)
Casanova Confined for baritone and backing track (1995)
Night and Dreams: The Death of Sigmund Freud for tenor and backing track (1999)
Rembrandt's Wife, opera (2007–2009)

Orchestral
Concerto for Orchestra (1980)
The Big Parade (1986)
Manhattan Epiphanies for string orchestra (1999)
The Furry Dance (1999)
Scenes from Bruegel for chamber orchestra (2006)
Headlong (2006)
Symphony (2008)
Bright Shiners for string orchestra (2009)
Blitz for orchestra, (optional) chorus and pre-recorded voices (2011)

Concertos
Piano Concerto: Imaginings (1991)
The Great Memory for cello and orchestra (1994)
The Unquiet Grave for viola and chamber orchestra (1997–1998)
Raga for electric guitar and orchestra (2015–2016)

Vocal and choral
A Martian Sends a Postcard Home for tenor, horn and piano (1986)
Wassails and Lullabies for SATB choir and percussion (1989), recorded by ABC Classics
Harbour for tenor and string orchestra (1992)
The Past for counter-tenor, flute and string orchestra (with ad lib didgeridoo) (1997), a setting of Oodgeroo Noonuccal's poem 'The Past' and excerpts from James Cook's ship's log
Learning to Howl for soprano, clarinet/sax, harp and percussion (2001)
Tales of the Supernatural for folk singer and string quartet (2002)
An die Musik for SATB choir (2005)
Elegy in a Country Graveyard for SATB choir, brass or concert band (flexible instrumentation) and pre-recorded voices and instruments (2007)
Domestic Advice for soprano and piano (2007)
A Singing Quilt for SATB choir, percussion ensemble and pre-recorded voices (2008)
Willow Songs: six poems of Anne Stevenson for soprano, mezzo-soprano and mixed ensemble (2009)
Waiting for the Barbarians for large chorus (2011), based on the poem by Constantine P. Cavafy
Last Words, song cycle for piano trio and soprano (2013 premiered by Anna Goldsworthy, Seraphim Trio, Jane Sheldon)
The Drowners for baritone and chamber orchestra (2015)
Missa brevis for SATB choir and organ (2015)
Comeclose and Sleepnow for singer and jazz ensemble (2016), to words by Adrian Henri, Brian Patten and Roger McGough

Ensemble
Chamber Concerto No 3: In Constant Flight for solo violin and ensemble (1988)
Ringing the Changes for piccolo, bass clarinet and piano (1990)
Pastoral for string octet (1991)
Tattoo for 12 timpani (6 players) and 4 pianos (1998)
Icarus Drowning (1998)
Chamber Concerto No. 4 (2002)
Sad Jigs for string quintet (2005)
A Reel, a Fling and a Ghostly Galliard (String Quartet No 2) (2006)
Oma kodu for clarinet and string quartet (2006)
Nine Fantasies about Brahms for piano trio (2009)
On Winter's Traces for piccolo, bass clarinet, piano and string quartet (2009) for the 30th anniversary of the Australia Ensemble
The Rising (2010) for the Black Dyke Band
The Scattering of Light for piano quartet (2010) commissioned to mark the centenary of the University of Queensland
String Quartet No 3 (2012) for the Brodsky Quartet
String Quartet No 4 (2012) for the NOISE String Quartet
String Quartet No 5 (2013) for the Australian String Quartet
Uproar for 11 trombones and four bass drums (2013)
Common Ground for two string quartets (2014)
Contradance for 11 players (2015)

Instrumental
Like Icarus ascending for solo violin (1984)
Swansong for solo viola (1987)
Spinning for solo alto flute (1988)
The Very End of Harvest for viola and piano (2000)
The Waltz Book (60 one-minute waltzes for solo piano, 2002; commissioned by Ian Munro)
War and Peace for violin and percussion (2004)
Chorales from an Ox Life for viola and double bass (2007)
Folly for solo piano (2007)
You Must Sleep, but I Must Dance for viola and percussion (2010)
On Reflection for two pianos (2012)
Once upon a time there were two brothers...for flute and voice (2013)

Radiophonic
Deirdre of the Sorrows (1989)
Elegy in a Country Graveyard (2007)

Awards and nominations

Ford's awards include the 2004 Paul Lowin Song Cycle Prize (for Learning to Howl), the 2003 Jean Bogan Prize (for The Waltz Book) and the 2012 Albert H. Maggs Composition Award for his work Rauha. His works Blitz and Willow Songs were both shortlisted for the 2013 Paul Lowin Prizes, Last Words was shortlisted for the 2016 Paul Lowin Song Cycle Prize, and his radiophonic work Elegy in a Country Graveyard was shortlisted for the 2007 Prix Italia. He has also had nominations and awards in the Art Music Awards, formerly known as Classical Music Awards (for details see below).

APRA Awards

The APRA Awards are presented annually from 1982 by the Australasian Performing Right Association (APRA). They include the Art Music Awards (until 2009 Classical Music Awards) which are distributed by APRA and the Australian Music Centre (AMC).

|-
| 2004 || Learning to Howl – Ford || Best Composition by an Australian Composer || 
|-
| 2005 || Tales of the Supernatural – Ford – Australian String Quartet, Jane Edwards || Vocal or Choral Work of the Year || 
|-
| 2008 || Ford || Outstanding Contribution by an Individual || 
|-
| 2009 || Learning to Howl – Ford – Arcko Symphonic Project || Best Performance of an Australian Composition || 
|-
| 2011 || A Dream of Drowning – Ford – West Australian Symphony Orchestra || Work of the Year – Orchestral || 
|-
| 2013 || Blitz – Ford – Tasmanian Symphony Orchestra || Work of the Year – Orchestral || 
|-
| rowspan="2"| 2014 || Last Words – Ford – Jane Sheldon and the Seraphim Trio || Work of the Year – Vocal/Choral || 
|-
| String Quartet No. 5 – Ford – Australian String Quartet || Work of the Year – Instrumental ||

Bibliography 
Composer to Composer: Conversations about Contemporary Music (paperback 1993, hardback 1993, 2nd edition paperback 1997)
Illegal Harmonies: Music in the 20th Century (hardback 1997, 2nd edition paperback 2002)
Undue Noise: Words about Music (paperback 2002)
Speaking in Tongues: The Songs of Van Morrison by Martin Buzacott and Andrew Ford (paperback 2005)
In Defence of Classical Music (hardback 2005)
The Sound of Pictures: listening to the movies from Hitchcock to High Fidelity (paperback 2010)
Illegal Harmonies: Music in the Modern Age (expanded 3rd edition paperback 2011)
Try Whistling This: writings about music (paperback 2012)
Earth Dances: music in search of the primitive (paperback 2015)
The Memory of Music, Black Inc (2017)

References
Sources
 Joyce Morgan: "A Composer's Subterranean Half-century", The Sydney Morning Herald, 15 March 2007
The Concise Oxford Dictionary of Music, 4th edition (1996). New York: Oxford University Press.
Notes

External links

The Music Show, ABC Radio National

1957 births
20th-century classical composers
20th-century English composers
21st-century classical composers
APRA Award winners
Australian classical composers
Australian male classical composers
Australian music critics
Classical music radio presenters
English classical composers
English emigrants to Australia
English male classical composers
English music critics
English writers
Living people
Alumni of Lancaster University
Alumni of Cartmel College, Lancaster
Recipients of the Medal of the Order of Australia
ABC radio (Australia) journalists and presenters
Winners of the Albert H. Maggs Composition Award
20th-century British male musicians
21st-century British male musicians